Rhodococcus rhodochrous is a bacterium used as a soil inoculant in agriculture and horticulture.

It is gram positive, in the shape of rods/cocci, oxidase negative, and catalase positive.

It is industrially produced to catalyse acrylonitrile conversion to acrylamide. It is also used in the industrial production of nicotinamide (niacinamide), a derivative or active form of niacin, part of the B vitamin complex.

A 2015 study showed that Rhodococcus rhodochrous could inhibit the growth of Pseudogymnoascus destructans, the fungal species responsible for white nose syndrome in bats.

References

Further reading 
 Retrieved 13 November 2014.

External links
Type strain of Rhodococcus rhodochrous at BacDive -  the Bacterial Diversity Metadatabase

Soil biology
Mycobacteriales